The Woman Michael Married is a lost 1919 American silent society drama film directed by Henry Kolker and produced by and starring Bessie Barriscale. Distribution of the film was through newly formed Robertson-Cole, soon to form into the FBO company.

Plot
As described in a film magazine, after professional diver Mira Sacky (Barriscale) rescues a child from the incoming tide, Michael Ordsway (Holt), a son of wealth, offers her any reward she might mention. She demands that he marry her. Being a good sport, he does so. Then she offers to leave him for $10,000 and the protection of his name for two years, but he refuses. To quiet talk about them, she lives with him for a while but as a wife in name only. She entertains his guests until one of them insults her, and she leaves. Michael's father (Guise), while strolling on the beach one day, meets Mira and, upon learning her identity, attempts to bring about a reconciliation. Michael refuses and goes abroad. Visiting his sister in Rome two years later he finds Mira a prima donna. Realizing that they love each other, they put aside their differences.

Cast
Bessie Barriscale as Mira Sacky
Jack Holt as Michael Ordsway
Marcia Manon as Doris Steele
Tom Guise as Ordsway, Sr.
Charles H. West as Harvey Kirkland
Bonnie Hill as Leila, Princess Marchesi
Cameron Coffey as Bobby
Mary Jane Irving as Girl

References

External links

 

1919 films
American silent feature films
Lost American films
Films based on short fiction
Films directed by Henry Kolker
American black-and-white films
Silent American drama films
1919 drama films
Film Booking Offices of America films
1919 lost films
Lost drama films
1910s American films